The Sun Web Developer Pack (SWDP) is a collection of open source software released by Sun Microsystems for developing web applications that run on Java EE application servers. The SWDP is targeted at software developers interested in writing web applications that use Web 2.0 technologies such as Ajax, REST, Atom, and JavaScript.

Software Included in the SWDP
The SWDP consists of the following software:
 Scripting language support
 Project Phobos, a project that allows you to write web applications in JavaScript or other scripting languages
 Ajax technologies
 Project jMaki, a framework for creating Ajax-enabled web applications in Java, PHP, or Phobos
 Project Dynamic Faces, a framework for creating Ajax-enabled JavaServer Faces applications
 REST
 RESTful web services, an API for creating REST web services in Java
 WADL
 ROME, a Java API for parsing and generating RSS and Atom web feeds
 Atom Server (The ROME Propono subproject), a prototype Java API and framework for creating a web feed server for Atom feeds

Release history

Release 1 of the SWDP was made public on March 12, 2007.

External links
 Sun Web Developer Pack home page
 Documentation
 Online SWDP Tutorial
 SWDP Tutorial bundle download
 Getting Started with the SWDP
 java.net project pages
 Project jMaki
 Project Dynamic Faces
 Project Phobos
 WADL
 ROME API

Scripting languages
Web services
Java (programming language)
Sun Microsystems
Sun Microsystems software
Web frameworks
Java enterprise platform
Software architecture